Decebalus is a genus of cicadas in the family Cicadidae. There is at least one described species in Decebalus, D. ugandanus.

References

Further reading

 
 
 
 

Chlorocystini
Cicadidae genera